Myself is a reflexive pronoun in English.

Myself may also refer to:
The intensive pronoun usage of myself
Myself (album) by Jolin Tsai

Songs: 
"Myself" (Nav song)
"Myself" on Cosmic (Bazzi album)
"Myself" on Spirit (Leona Lewis album)
"Myself", a 2019 song by Post Malone from Hollywood's Bleeding
"Myself" on Welcome (Taproot album)
"Myself" on Villains (The Verve Pipe album)

See also
Me, Myself, and I (disambiguation)